Jaime Elizabeth Pressly (born July 30, 1977) is an American  actress, fashion designer, and model. Best known for her role as Joy Turner on the NBC sitcom My Name Is Earl, she won a Primetime Emmy Award for Outstanding Supporting Actress in a Comedy Series and garnered nominations for a Golden Globe Award and a Screen Actors Guild Award. She has appeared in films including: Jerry Springer's Ringmaster (1998), Not Another Teen Movie (2001), Joe Dirt (2001), I Love You, Man (2009), and A Haunted House 2 (2014). For her portrayal of Jill Kendall on the CBS sitcom Mom (2014–2021), she was nominated for the Critics' Choice Television Award for Best Supporting Actress in a Comedy Series.

Early life and modeling
Pressly was born in Kinston, North Carolina, the daughter of Brenda Sue (née Smith), a dance instructor, and James Liston Pressly, a car salesman. In 1992, she moved with her family to Costa Mesa, California, where she spent the first semester of her high school sophomore year. She spent her childhood and early teenage years training as a gymnast, which led her to modeling jobs. At age 14, she appeared on her first cover, Teen Magazine, and became the spokesmodel for the International Cover Model Search. At 15, she dropped out of school and went to Japan on a modeling contract. She succeeded in having herself legally emancipated from her parents at 15 so she could travel to Japan, as neither of her parents could make the trip.

Acting career

Early roles, 1997–2004
After making an uncredited appearance in Baywatch in 1995, followed by filming a cameo in the film Mercenary in 1996, Pressly starred as Violet, a vengeful seductress, in the 1997 direct-to-DVD film Poison Ivy: The New Seduction, the third installment of the Poison Ivy series. After a small role in the teen cult classic Can't Hardly Wait, television appearances followed, with guest roles in the short-lived Push and Mortal Kombat: Conquest. She went on to play one of the leads in Jack & Jill, which aired for two seasons, from September 26, 1999, to April 15, 2001, on The WB. Pressly headlined the independent film Poor White Trash (2000), playing scheming gold-digger Sandy Lake, and appeared in three 2001 theatrical releases aimed at a teenage audience, which despite varying degrees of success, helped her receive more exposure. The parody film Not Another Teen Movie, most notably, featured her as Priscilla, a high school cheerleader opposite Chris Evans, while she took on the roles of a young wife in the sex comedy Tomcats and that of a Southern love interest in the comedy Joe Dirt, opposite David Spade.

In 2002, Pressly starred as a college student trapped in a haunted island in the independent horror film Demon Island. Felix Vasquez of Cinema Crazed regarded it as a guilty pleasure and stated: "[She] does what she can with her character and comes off as a rather charming character". She next portrayed a crazed, motorcycle-riding criminal in the action thriller Torque (2004), alongside Ice Cube. In a profile, The New Yorker, describing this phase of her career, asserted: "She is typically cast on the strength of her looks and her Southern sassiness, and she has had girlfriend roles in several forgettable teensploitation flicks".

Breakthrough, 2005–2009

Between 2005 and 2009, Pressly played Joy Turner, the pessimistic, cold-hearted, stubborn and vain ex-wife of a small-time thief, in the NBC sitcom My Name Is Earl, which was a success with critics and audiences. She garnered nominations for a Golden Globe and a Screen Actors Guild Award, and in 2007, she won a Primetime Emmy Award for Outstanding Supporting Actress in a Comedy Series for her work on the show. Pressly once called her role her "greatest release" and thanked creator Greg Garcia for restoring her faith in the business. She remarked: "[The series] came at a time when I was questioning whether this was the path I wanted to continue following. I was tired of living out of my suitcase, coming and going all the time. I wanted a little normalcy in my life."

During the early run of My Name is Earl, Pressly produced and took on the role of a homicidal magazine editor in the independent film Death to the Supermodels (2005), a role she compared to that of Reese Witherspoon in Election. In his review for the film, Scott Weinberg of DVDTalk.com, wrote: "Jaime Pressly is a funny, funny woman. To those of you My Name is Earl fans who are just now discovering the juicy talents of the perpetually sneering, eye-rolling, attitude machine known as Jaime Pressly, I'd recommend you check out her work in flicks like Ringmaster, Tomcats, Joe Dirt, Torque, and Not Another Teen Movie. Basically, if we were giving out an award for "the consistently best thing in a series of generally atrocious comedies," Jaime would be walking home with that prize, no sweat. Regardless of how bad the movie is [...] Jaime always seems like a kooky and kinetic cartoon character who somehow figured out how to become flesh & blood. Yes, she's sexy and all that, but Jaime Pressly is also funny, and that just amplifies all her other assets".

In DOA: Dead or Alive (2006), a British-German-American martial arts action film, Pressly starred as one of four female fighters working together to uncover the secret that the organizer of an invitational martial arts contest is trying to hide. While the film was relatively successful on some markets, it only found a limited audience in North America. In 2006, she also hosted the first annual VH1 Rock Honors, and an episode of Saturday Night Live, and guest-starred on MADtv, playing Hillary Clinton in a parody of My Name Is Earl, "My Name Is Dubya", in which George W. Bush (Frank Caliendo) makes a list of all the bad things he has done in the past and rectifies them one by one. She voiced a bird in the computer-animated comedy hit Horton Hears a Who! (2008), featuring Jim Carrey, Steve Carell, Will Arnett, among others.

In I Love You, Man (2009), Pressly starred opposite Paul Rudd and Jason Segel, as the best friend of a bride-to-be and one half of a volatile married couple. The film received critical acclaim and was a box office success, grossing US$92 million worldwide. Rolling Stone found her "terrific" in her role, asserting: "Her battles with [her on-screen husband] have genuine comic bite".

2010–present
The ABC Family television film Beauty & the Briefcase (2010), co-starring Hilary Duff, featured Pressly as a primary editor at Cosmopolitan magazine. The premiere received 2.4 million viewers attracting a strong female audience that drove the network to an all-time high in viewers. Smoke Screen, another 2010 television film, saw her star as a reporter finding herself in the middle of a murder investigation when she wakes up next to a dead body. In 2010, Pressly also guest-starred in two episodes of the CBS comedy Rules of Engagement, as a possible surrogate mother for Jeff and Audrey (Patrick Warburton and Megyn Price).

In 6 Month Rule (2011), an independent film released for limited theaters and digital markets, Pressly played what was described as a "harridan of an ex-fiancée" by the New York Times. She appeared in the interactive educational children's musical comedy The Oogieloves in the Big Balloon Adventure (2012), as a flamenco dancer riding a giant flying sombrero. Budgeted at US$20 million, the film only made US$445,000 in more than 2,000 screens during its opening weekend. Pressly next had regular roles in two short-lived series. The Fox sitcom I Hate My Teenage Daughter (2011–2012) saw her portray a mother fearing her daughter is turning into the kind of girl who tormented her in high school, while the TV Land comedy Jennifer Falls (2014) featured her as a single mother, who after being fired from a high-paying job, becomes a waitress in her brother's bar.

Pressly obtained leading roles in three 2014 film releases. In A Haunted House 2, Pressly starred as a mother of two and one half of an interracial couple, alongside Marlon Wayans. She had known Wayans for 15 years prior filming and the project marked the first time they worked together. Describing the process, she said: "It was a match made in heaven. It really was. We're both high energy, and we both like to do something new every take, and when you do comedy like this, where you get to improv the majority of the time, it’s about trying to one-up each other, and that makes for a really great comedy". The film was panned by critics, but was a decent box office success. She starred opposite singer Robin Thicke in the romantic comedy Making the Rules, which was filmed in 2012. Finders Keepers, a television horror film, saw Pressly play a divorced mother whose life is thrown into turmoil when her young daughter becomes obsessed with an evil doll left behind by the previous owners.

From 2014 to 2021, Pressly portrayed Jill Kendall, a wealthy socialite and alcoholic, in the CBS sitcom Mom. On August 4, 2022, Fox announced that Pressly had joined cast of the sitcom Welcome to Flatch as a series regular for the second season.

Other ventures

Fashion 
In 2003, Pressly launched a lingerie line, J'aime by Jaime Pressly, and expanded it to clothing and sleepwear. In 2007, People magazine called her spring/summer clothing line a "sophisticated and star-studded fashion show" and "one of the biggest shows of L.A. Fashion Week." In spring 2008, she launched a second clothing line, J'aime Collection. "I've always had an interest in design, and I have always loved creating things," Pressly said in an interview with Redbook in 2008. She ended her clothing lines in September 2008.

In the media 
In a 2008 interview with Redbook magazine, Pressly credited her success for "lifelong willingness to defy convention."

Pressly's appearance has often been the subject of media attention. She has appeared on several lists for world's most beautiful or sexiest women. Her changing looks and style have received noteworthy praise from periodicals such as InStyle.

In 2000, she became a spokesmodel for Liz Claiborne Cosmetics and advertised the company's fragrance "Lucky You". In 2008, she appeared in an infomercial for Susan Lucci's "Youthful Essence" personal microdermabrasion kit, and an advertisement for Axe in 2010. She has graced the covers of numerous magazines, including InStyle Weddings, Ocean Drive, Health, Esquire, Redbook, Shape, Stuff, Maxim and Playboy.

Personal life

Pressly has revealed in interviews that she briefly struggled with bulimia as a teenager.

In 1996, she met DJ Eric Calvo, and they started dating in 2004. On May 11, 2007, in Cedars-Sinai Medical Center, Pressly gave birth to their son. In November 2008, the couple announced their separation.

Nine months later, in July 2009, Pressly announced her engagement to entertainment lawyer Simran Singh. They married on September 26, 2009, at the Dick Clark estate, on a bluff overlooking the Pacific Ocean. On January 21, 2011, Pressly filed for divorce from Singh, citing irreconcilable differences.

On January 5, 2011, two weeks before filing for divorce, Pressly was arrested in Santa Monica, California, for suspicion of driving under the influence. She eventually pleaded no contest and received three years of informal probation.

In October 2017, Pressly gave birth to twin sons with her longtime boyfriend Hamzi Hijazi.

Filmography

Film

Television

Video games

Music videos

Awards and nominations

References

External links

 
 

1977 births
American female models
American film actresses
American television actresses
Outstanding Performance by a Supporting Actress in a Comedy Series Primetime Emmy Award winners
Living people
Actresses from California
Actresses from North Carolina
Female models from California
People from Costa Mesa, California
People from Kinston, North Carolina
20th-century American actresses
21st-century American actresses
Female models from North Carolina